The 2014–15 Kansas State Wildcats men's basketball team represented Kansas State University in the 2014–15 NCAA Division I men's basketball season. Their head coach was Bruce Weber, and was his third year at the helm of the Wildcats. The team played its home games in Bramlage Coliseum in Manhattan, Kansas, its home court since 1988. Kansas State was a member of the Big 12 Conference.

Preseason
The Wildcats finished the previous season 20–13, 10–8 in Big 12 play to finish in fifth place. They lost in the quarterfinals of the Big 12 tournament to Iowa State. They received an at-large bid to the NCAA tournament where they lost in the second round to Kentucky.

Departures

Incoming Transfers

Class of 2014 recruits

Roster

Schedule

|-
!colspan=12 style="background:#512888; color:#FFFFFF;"| Exhibition
|-

|-
!colspan=12 style="background:#512888; color:#FFFFFF;"| Non-conference regular season

|-
!colspan=12 style="background:#512888; color:#FFFFFF;"| Big 12 regular season

|-
!colspan=12 style="background:#512888; color:#FFFFFF;"| Big 12 tournament

References

Kansas State Wildcats men's basketball seasons
Kansas State
2014 in sports in Kansas
2015 in sports in Kansas